Dinamina is a Sinhala language daily newspaper in Sri Lanka. It is published by the Associated Newspapers of Ceylon Limited (Lake House), a government-owned corporation. The newspaper commenced publishing in 1909. It was founded by the Sinhalese scholar H. S. Perera who acted as both owner and editor-in-chief of the paper at the outset. Upon Perera's death in December 1914, D. R. Wijewardena  (who would later go on to become a prominent figure in the country's struggle for independence) bought out the company. It is now owned by the government of Sri Lanka.

The newspaper's offices were located initially at First Cross Street, Colombo, and was printed at the Lankabhimanava Vishrutha press. Later, Wijewardene bought a larger area of land elsewhere in Colombo, and built 'Lake House' building, which then became home to the offices of the Dinamina, along with several other newspapers that Wijewardene began, including the Sri Lankan English daily, the Daily News. Despite the plethora of other newspapers based in the building, it became known as the 'Dinamina Kantoruva' in Sinhala, meaning 'Dinamina Centre'. The price of a copy was three cents in Ceylonese rupees at the time it first began circulation.

The newspaper is written as a broadsheet, with photographs printed both in color and black and white. Weekday printings include the main section, containing news on national affairs, international affairs, business, political analysis, sports, editorials and opinions. Separate sections contain classifieds, and, depending on the city it is distributed in, local (metropolitan) news. Since 26th January 2020 the editor-in-chief of the daily Dinamina is Gamini Jayalath.
Previously it was held by Pushpa Rowel and she was the first woman to rise to the rank of the Chief Editor of a Sinhala national newspaper.

Dinamina Online Edition (www.dinamina.lk) 

www.dinamina.lk is online edition of dinamina newspaper.
www.dinamina.lk won Best Designed News Website award in Journalism Awards for Excellence 2016 (Sinhala stream) 

www.dinamina.lk won a Merit award in the Best Sinhala Language Website category in Best Web.lk event organised by LK Domain Registry.

See also
List of newspapers in Sri Lanka
Associated Newspapers of Ceylon

References

External links 
Dinamina official website
 Official Blog

Associated Newspapers of Ceylon Limited
Daily newspapers published in Sri Lanka
Publications established in 1909
Sinhala-language newspapers published in Sri Lanka